The Vikram-class offshore patrol vessel is a series of seven offshore patrol vessels (OPV) being built at the Kattupalli shipyard by L&T Shipbuilding for the Indian Coast Guard. These are long range surface ships which are capable of coastal and offshore patrolling.

History
In March 2015, L&T Shipbuilding was awarded a  contract by the Ministry of Defence to build seven offshore vessel patrol vessels for the Indian Coast Guard.

The last ship Vigraha will be commissioned by Defence Minister Rajnath Singh on 28 August 2021.

Specification
The class will be armed with a  CRN 91 Naval Gun, two  heavy machine guns with fire control system, a helicopter for various operational, surveillance, and search and rescue missions. It also has modern radar; navigation and communication systems; front propulsion pods providing high maneuverability. It has been indigenously designed and has undergone dual certification from the American Bureau of Shipping and Indian Register of Shipping. The ships would be tasked with the roles of policing maritime zones, control and surveillance, search and rescue, pollution response, anti-smuggling and anti-piracy in the economic zones of the country.

Ships

Gallery

See also

References

Patrol ship classes
Ships of the Indian Coast Guard